Spratelloides is a genus of fish in the family Clupeidae. They are small fish used as fishing bait, especially in skipjack tuna-fishing. Some species are also valued as food in certain countries, like Spratelloides gracilis, known as kibinago in Japan.

Species
The recognized species in this genus are:
 Spratelloides atrofasciatus L. P. Schultz, 1943 (small-banded round herring) 
 Spratelloides delicatulus (E. T. Bennett, 1832) (delicate round herring)
 Spratelloides gracilis (Temminck & Schlegel, 1846) (silver-stripe round herring)
 Spratelloides lewisi Wongratana, 1983 (Lewis' round herring)
 Spratelloides robustus J. D. Ogilby, 1897 (fringe-scale round herring)

References

Clupeidae
Marine fish genera
Taxa named by Pieter Bleeker